145523 Lulin, provisional designation , is a background asteroid from the central region of the asteroid belt, approximately  in diameter. It was discovered on 7 March 2006, by Taiwanese astronomers Hung-Chin Lin (林宏欽) and Ye Quanzhi (葉泉志) at Lulin Observatory in central Taiwan. It was named for the Lulin mountain and the observatory site.

Orbit and classification 

Lulin is a non-family asteroid from the main belt's background population. It orbits the Sun in the central asteroid belt at a distance of 2.2–3.2 AU once every 4 years and 7 months (1,664 days; semi-major axis of 2.75 AU). Its orbit has an eccentricity of 0.18 and an inclination of 11° with respect to the ecliptic. The earliest precovery was taken at ESO's La Silla Observatory in March 1992, extending the asteroid's observation arc by 14 years prior to its discovery observation.

Naming 

This minor planet was named after the Lulin mountain in central Taiwan, location of the discovering Lulin Observatory at an altitude of 2862 meters. The official  was published by the Minor Planet Center on 2 April 2007. At the observatory, Comet Lulin was discovered in 2007.

Physical characteristics 

According to the survey carried out by the NEOWISE mission of NASA's Wide-field Infrared Survey Explorer, the asteroid measures 3.9 kilometers in diameter and its surface has a low albedo of 0.073, which is rather typical for a carbonaceous C-type body. As of 2018, no rotational lightcurve of Lulin has been obtained from photometric observations. The body's rotation period, pole and shape remain unknown.

References

External links 
 Dictionary of Minor Planet Names, Google books
 Discovery Circumstances: Numbered Minor Planets (145001)-(150000) – Minor Planet Center
 
 

145523
Discoveries by Hung-Chin Lin
Discoveries by Quanzhi Ye
Named minor planets
20060307